Tempest 4000 is a shoot 'em up video game developed by Llamasoft and published by Atari, SA. It is a modern reimagining of the classic arcade game Tempest, which was released in 1981. In Tempest 4000, players control a spaceship and navigate through a series of increasingly challenging levels while fighting off waves of enemies. Tempest 4000 was released for Playstation 4, Xbox One, Microsoft Windows and Nintendo Switch. 

The game features colorful, neon-filled graphics and a techno soundtrack that adds to its futuristic and immersive gameplay experience. Players can choose from a variety of weapons and power-ups to help them defeat their enemies and progress through the levels. Tempest 4000 also includes a multiplayer mode, allowing players to compete against each other online or in local play.

Gameplay
Tempest 4000 is a shoot 'em up video game. Players take a control of the Claw, a spacecraft that can shoot at enemies and obstructions. Levels take place on geometric prisms. The goal of the game is to survive each level by eliminating enemies as soon as possible and to achieve high scores for leaderboard positions. The game features one hundred levels and three game modes: standard, pure, and endurance.

Development
Tempest 4000 was developed by Llamasoft, a company founded by British video game designer and programmer Jeff Minter. In 1994, Minter created Tempest 2000—a remake of the 1981 arcade game Tempest—for the Atari Jaguar. In 2015, Llamasoft released the Tempest-inspired video game TxK independently for the PlayStation Vita. Due to similarities between Tempest and TxK, Atari, SA blocked the release of TxK on other platforms. Minter was unhappy with Ataris intervention; despite this, he partnered with the company to create Tempest 4000. Tempest 4000 started out development as a virtual reality (VR) version of TxK but Atari forced the developer to remove the VR mode from the final game.

The game supports native 4K resolution and features a soundtrack inspired by 1990s-era techno music.

Release
Tempest 4000 was announced August 2017, and the game was showcased later that month at Gamescom. The game was expected to release on Windows-based personal computers, and the PlayStation 4 and Xbox One video game consoles. Tempest 4000 was scheduled to be released on the PlayStation 4 on 28 March 2018 but was delayed,
until in July and was released for multiple platforms.

Atari later announced that the game would be a launch title for their upcoming Atari VCS microconsole in 2019, but this was denied by Llamasoft. Atari announced that the game will be re-released for the Nintendo Switch and Atari VCS on March 22, 2022.

Reception

References

External links
 

Llamasoft games
PlayStation 4 games
Shoot 'em ups
Video games developed in the United Kingdom
Windows games
Xbox One games